Francesco Laurana, also known as Francesco de la Vrana (c. 1430 – before 12 March 1502) was a Dalmatian sculptor and medallist. He is considered both a Croatian and an Italian sculptor.  Though born in the territory of the Republic of Venice, he spent his mature career at the other end of Italy, moving between Naples and Sicily, and Urbino, and finally in southern France, where he died.

He was one of the more significant and complex sculptors of the 15th century – complex because of his activities within varying cultural circles and his exposure to differing influences. His best works evolved in the workshop tradition in collaboration with other artists. His portrait busts reveal a creative individuality that was seen as particularly fascinating in the late 19th century. Though it is impossible to chart his stylistic development, his later work made in France shows some assimilation of northern realism, which is absent from the work executed in Italy.

Life and works

Laurana was born in Vrana, near Zadar, in Dalmatia. Under Venetian rule Vrana was named La Vrana, from romance de Vrana, giving the surname used by Francesco Laurana: LA VRANA -> LAVRANA which is read like LAURANA because the letter U is written as V in inscriptions in Latin.

After an apprenticeship under a sculptor, he began his solo career at Naples, where he was one of the team of sculptors finishing the triumphal arch of Castel Nuovo for Alfonso V of Aragon. After the death of Alfonso (1458) he was called to Aix-en-Provence to the court of René d'Anjou, the former and still titular King of Naples, who commissioned him to do a series of bronze portrait medals of personages at the court.

From 1466 to 1471 Laurana was in Sicily. Works of this period include the Mastrantonio Chapel and the tomb of Pietro Speciale in the church of S. Francesco in Palermo, the side door of the church of St. Marguerite in Sciacca, Madonna and Child sculptures in the cathedrals of Palermo (1471) and Noto, and a bust allegedly portraying Eleanor of Aragon, now in the Palazzo Abatellis in Palermo, Sicily.

In 1471 he traveled to Naples where he executed the sculpture of the Virgin in the Sta. Barbara Chapel. From 1474 to 1477 Laura spent three years in Urbino, where his relative Luciano Laurana worked. He then went to Marseille, where he built a small chapel in the Cathedral of S. Marie Majeure (1475–1481), the first structure in France designed entirely in the Renaissance style. His workshop in Marseille created the St. Lazarus marble altar as well as the retable of the Calvary in St. Didier d'Avignon, and the tombs of Giovanni Cossa at Sainte-Marthe de Tarascon and Charles, comte du Maine, in Le Mans.

Laurana died at Marseille or Avignon, in 1502.

Notes

See also
 Croats of Italy

References

External links 

Some works in the Louvre
Francesco Laurana
Half-length Bust of the infant Saint Cyricus (Getty Museum); biographic notes

1430s births
1502 deaths
Dalmatian Italians
Croatian sculptors
Renaissance artists
15th-century Italian sculptors
Italian male sculptors
People from Zadar
Italian medallists
15th-century Croatian people
16th-century Croatian people
Catholic sculptors